The Pista Olimpia Terenzano is a 4,000-capacity motorcycle stadium in the Terenzano Province of Udine. The stadium is situated south of Udine and north east of Pozzuolo del Friuli. The stadium has been the home of the World Championship round known as the Speedway Grand Prix of Italy from 2009 to 2013.

The stadium hosts the speedway club known as the Moto Club Olimpia (formed in 1971) and also hosts the Italian Individual Speedway Championship, the Italian team championship, the Italian Pairs Championship and the world speedway event qualifications. 

The speedway track has a circumference of 400 metres.

See also 
Speedway Grand Prix of Italy

References

Speedway venues in Italy